Remixed and Reimagined may refer to:
 Remixed and Reimagined (Nina Simone album), the first album in the Legacy Remixed series released by Sony BMG
 Remixed and Reimagined (Billie Holiday album), the second entry in Sony BMG's Legacy Remixed series